Shirley Clarke Franklin (born May 10, 1945) is an American politician, a member of the Democratic Party who served as the 58th mayor of Atlanta, Georgia, from 2002 to 2010. She currently serves as a member on the board of directors for both Delta Air Lines and Mueller Water Products.

The 58th mayor of Atlanta, she was the first woman to hold the post and the first black woman to be elected mayor of a major Southern city. Franklin was Atlanta's fourth African-American mayor. In July 2009, Mayor Franklin (along with Frances Townsend and Judge William H. Webster) was appointed to an ad hoc Department of Homeland Security special task force for 60-day review of the Homeland Security Advisory System.

Personal life
Franklin has a daughter, Kai Franklin Graham, whose former husband, Tremayne "Kiki" Graham, was sentenced to life in prison for his involvement in a drug dealing operation. Kai herself pled guilty to helping to lauder money for him. Tremayne has been a known associate of the Black Mafia Family. Shirley Franklin had a son named Cabral. He died in 2015.

According to a DNA analysis, Franklin is descended, mainly, from people of Guinea-Bissau and Sierra Leone.

Education
Originally from Philadelphia, Pennsylvania, she is a graduate of the Philadelphia High School for Girls. Franklin received her B.A. in sociology from Howard University and her M.A., also in sociology, from the University of Pennsylvania.
She is an Honorary member of Delta Sigma Theta sorority.

Political career
Franklin served as the Commissioner of Cultural Affairs under Mayor Maynard Jackson. Subsequently, she was named Chief Administrative Officer and City Manager under Mayor Andrew Young.

Her 2001 run for mayor was her first run for public office. She won, succeeding Mayor Bill Campbell after winning 50 percent of the vote, defeating several candidates including Democrat Rob Pitts (33 percent). Facing a massive and unexpected budget deficit, Franklin slashed the number of government employees and increased taxes to balance the budget as quickly as possible.

Franklin made repairing the Atlanta sewer system a main focus of her office. Prior to Franklin's term, Atlanta's combined sewer system violated the federal Clean Water Act and burdened the city government with fines from the Environmental Protection Agency. In 2002, Franklin announced an initiative called "Clean Water Atlanta" to address the problem and begin improving the city's sewer system.

She has  been lauded for efforts to make the City of Atlanta "green." Under Franklin's leadership Atlanta has gone from having one of the lowest percentages of LEED certified buildings to one of the highest.

In 2005, Time named Franklin one of the five best big-city American mayors. In October of that same year, she was included in the U.S. News & World Report "Best Leaders of 2005" issue.

With solid popular support and strong backing from the business sector, Franklin was reelected Atlanta Mayor in 2005, garnering more than 90 percent of the vote. Her popularity led to increased speculation that she may be a viable contender for a future Georgia governor's race.

In February 2006, The White House Project named Shirley Franklin one of its "8 in '08", a group of eight female politicians who could possibly run and/or be elected president in 2008. She was the only person on the list to not be a governor, senator or presidential cabinet member, and one of two African-American women on the list; the other was United States Secretary of State Condoleezza Rice.

In 2006, Shirley Franklin led the effort to have the papers of Dr. Martin Luther King Jr. given to his alma mater, Morehouse College, instead of being sold at auction: "I never imagined I could contribute to the continuation of Dr. King's legacy in as a significant way. And I'm really humbled I was able to do anything to continue his legacy."

Franklin was a member of the Mayors Against Illegal Guns Coalition, an organization formed in 2006 and co-chaired by New York City mayor Michael Bloomberg and Boston mayor Thomas Menino.  She was 2007/08 President of the National Conference of Democratic Mayors.

In 2008, facing a major deficit, Mayor Franklin asked the Atlanta City Council to approve a property tax increase, to avoid public safety cuts. The Atlanta City Council unanimously shot down the measure, which would have caused the average city homeowner to pay an estimated extra $30 in property taxes under Franklin's plan. As Mayor Franklin warned, without the tax increase, layoffs and pay cuts of Atlanta public safety officials would be imminent.

According to the Atlanta Journal-Constitution, in December 2008 Franklin announced that 222 city workers would lose their jobs to help fill a projected $50 million to $60 million budget shortfall. Most remaining city workers, including firefighters, will work fewer hours and suffer a pay cut as part of the budget cuts.

Mayor Shirley Franklin has said that the deficits in the city of Atlanta are not because of excess city spending. In fact, according to the Atlanta Business Chronicle city spending actually ran slightly below budgeted amounts through the first quarter of the fiscal year that began in July. According to Mayor Shirley Franklin, city tax collections are down by more than 12 percent because of the economic downturn. However, basic accounting mistakes in the city budget also played a significant role in the budget crisis.

Franklin, along with Philadelphia's Michael Nutter and Phil Gordon of Phoenix, lobbied Treasury Secretary Henry Paulson in a joint letter asking for a share of the proposed $700 billion bailout.

Honors

Mayor Franklin was the recipient of Profile in Courage Award in 2005, issued by the John F. Kennedy Library Foundation. The foundation praised her management of the city of Atlanta during the critical period of enormous deficit and loss of public confidence in government following the corrupt administration of Mayor Bill Campbell. In 2007, she received an honorary degree in Doctor of Humane Letters from Oglethorpe University.

References

External links

Shirley Franklin website
CityMayors profile
Mayors Against Illegal Guns homepage

C-SPAN Q&A interview with Franklin, February 5, 2006

1945 births
African-American mayors in Georgia (U.S. state)
American people of Bissau-Guinean descent
American people of Sierra Leonean descent
Georgia (U.S. state) Democrats
Howard University alumni
Living people
Mayors of Atlanta
Philadelphia High School for Girls alumni
Politicians from Philadelphia
University of Pennsylvania alumni
Women mayors of places in Georgia (U.S. state)
Delta Air Lines people
21st-century American politicians
21st-century American women politicians
21st-century African-American women
21st-century African-American politicians
20th-century African-American people
20th-century African-American women
African-American women mayors